Stephen W. McKeever (October 31, 1853 in Brooklyn, New York – March 7, 1938 in Brooklyn, New York) was a construction contractor in Brooklyn, New York in the early 1900s. He and his brother Ed bought half of the Brooklyn Dodgers baseball team from Henry Medicus on January 2, 1912. Together with Charles Ebbets, who owned the other half of the team, they built Ebbets Field. When Ebbets died on April 18, 1925, Ed McKeever took over as team president. However, he caught a cold at Ebbets' funeral and died on April 29. Steve McKeever became the acting team president until Wilbert Robinson was elected team president on May 25, 1925. Steve McKeever was elected team president on October 12, 1932, and remained a 50% owner of the Dodgers until his death in 1938. He was buried in Holy Cross Cemetery in Brooklyn.

External links
Dodgers ownership history
Bio of the McKeevers
Dodgers history
NY Times article on the McKeevers purchasing shares of the team

References

Major League Baseball owners
Brooklyn Dodgers owners
Brooklyn Dodgers executives
Major League Baseball executives
Major League Baseball team presidents
1853 births
1938 deaths